The 1982 Tirreno–Adriatico was the 17th edition of the Tirreno–Adriatico cycle race and was held from 13 March to 18 March 1982. The race started in Cerenova Constantica and finished in San Benedetto del Tronto. The race was won by Giuseppe Saronni of the Del Tongo team.

General classification

References

1982
1982 in Italian sport
March 1982 sports events in Europe
1982 Super Prestige Pernod